I15 may refer to:
 Interstate 15, a north–south Interstate Highway in the United States of America
 Polikarpov I-15, a Soviet fighter aircraft
 I15 (band), a band
 , of the Imperial Japanese Navy
 Älvsborgs regemente (I 15) a former Swedish Army infantry regiment